The John Wallis Church of England Academy is a mixed all-through school with academy status in Ashford, Kent. It was known as Christ Church Church of England High School. On 1 September 2010 it became an academy, sponsored by the Diocese of Canterbury, Benenden School and Canterbury Christ Church University. The school specialises in Maths and Computing and is named after Ashford-born mathematician John Wallis.

The school officially became a 3-19 academy on 31 August 2012, educating pupils of primary and Secondary school ages, as well as a sixth form provision. The school holds places for 1400 students aged 3–19.

History

The high school attracted media attention after a pepper spray attack in February 2008.

References

External links

Ashford, Kent
Primary schools in Kent
Secondary schools in Kent
Academies in Kent
Church of England primary schools in the Diocese of Canterbury
Church of England secondary schools in the Diocese of Canterbury
Specialist maths and computing colleges in England